Riddlesworth Hall School is a former country house. It now serves as a boarding school. It is located in Riddlesworth, Norfolk, England.

History
It was acquired by Silvanus Bevan III (1743–1830) in 1792.

It later became the seat of the Compton-Thornhill baronets, including Sir Thomas Thornhill, 1st Baronet (1837-1900) and Sir Anthony John Compton-Thornhill, 2nd Baronet (1868–1949). The second baronet had no heirs and the hall was converted for use as a school.

Architecture
It was designed by architect Thomas Leverton (1743-1824) as a Georgian style three-storey manor house in 1792. It is surrounded by 12 hectares of parkland.

It was listed by English Heritage as a Grade II building on 21 July 1951.

Riddlesworth Hall Preparatory School

In 1946, Riddlesworth Hall School was established as a predominantly girls' school but now caters to both boys and girls aged 2 to 13. In October 2015 it was announced that Riddlesworth joined the Confucius International Education Group, which runs several international schools in China, Spain & USA. Riddlesworth was rebranded Confucius International School-Riddlesworth Hall (CISRH) as a result. The school is now expanding & going through a refurbishment and development programme.

Boarding
Full and part-time boarding is available for children from age 7. Enrollment is intentionally kept small. The Headmaster and his family live on campus and personally take responsibility for pastoral care of boarders.

Houses
Pupils are allocated to four houses, which are named after prominent British women. Points are awarded for "achievement, effort, behavior and generosity of spirit".

Notable former pupils
Diana, Princess of Wales

References

External links
School Profile at the Independent Schools Council website
Independent Schools Inspectorate Inspection Reports

English Heritage sites in Norfolk
Country houses in Norfolk
Boarding schools in Norfolk
Grade II listed houses
Grade II listed buildings in Norfolk
Georgian architecture in England
Houses completed in 1792
Bevan family